Cyperus appendiculatus is a species of sedge that is native to parts of Brazil.

See also 
 List of Cyperus species

References 

appendiculatus
Plants described in 1837
Flora of Brazil
Taxa named by Carl Sigismund Kunth
Taxa named by Adolphe-Théodore Brongniart